The 1986–87 NCAA football bowl games were a series of post-season games played in December 1986 and January 1987 to end the 1986 NCAA Division I-A football season. A total of 18 team-competitive games, and two all-star games, were played. The post-season began with the California Bowl on December 13, 1986, and concluded on January 17, 1987, with the season-ending Senior Bowl.

Schedule

References